Non-combatant is a term of art in the law of war and international humanitarian law to refer to civilians who are not taking a direct part in hostilities; persons, such as combat medics and military chaplains, who are members of the belligerent armed forces but are protected because of their specific duties (as currently described in Protocol I of the Geneva Conventions, adopted in June 1977); combatants who are placed hors de combat; and neutral persons, such as peacekeepers, who are not involved in fighting for one of the belligerents involved in a war. This particular status was first recognized under the Geneva Conventions with the First Geneva Convention of 1864.

History

Pre-Geneva Conventions 
The Hague Conventions of 1899 and 1907 were one of the first multi-country treaties to agree on rights for non-combatants. These meetings occurred in 1899 and in 1907. Three treaties were signed and put into effect in 1899, including the treatment of prisoners of war and the protection of hospital ships. In 1907 thirteen additional treaties were signed. These cover regulations concerning war on land, the declaration of war, the rights and responsibilities of neutral countries, and rights and restrictions during naval war.

Treaty II, Article 3 of the 1899 Convention maintains that surrendering belligerent fighters are to be treated as prisoners of war unless they are out of proper uniforms (i.e. spies). Article 13 of the same section declares that any other non-combatant or civilian affiliated with but not part of the belligerent military, such as reporters and contractors, have the same right to be treated as a prisoner of war.

Article 25 of Treaty II states that undefended communities are protected from any form of attack. In addition to the above, Article 27 states that if any sieges do occur, places devoted to religion, charity or hospitals should be avoided if possible, as long as they have no strategic affiliations.

Article 28 states that even when a village is captured through war, pillaging is not allowed by any party. That is repeated in Article 47, Section III. The articles above were reaffirmed by Convention IV of the 1907 Convention.

Many nations signed, including delegates from the United Kingdom, United States, Russia and Japan. Despite many nations signing at the Hague Conventions of 1899 and 1907, a number of the agreements were broken during World War I, including sections from Treaty IV involving poisons and the attacking of undefended towns and villages.

While some Geneva Conventions occurred before the Hague Conventions, none touched on the rights of non-combatants in the heat of combat. The Geneva Conventions recognizes and expands on many of the treaties signed at the Hague Conventions, particularly those involving the treatment of non-combatants. As a result, the regulations are still in effect today.

Geneva Conventions 
The Geneva Conventions started on April 21 and were concluded on August 12, 1949. The purpose of the convention was to establish protections afforded to civilians during a wartime period under military occupation. When the Geneva Conventions were ratified, there were several sections pursuant to the defining of a person as a non-combatant. Article 3 of the Geneva Conventions emphasizes the humane treatment of all persons not engaging in hostilities. Article 42 refers to the protection of aircrews parachuting from an aircraft. Article 50 provides the definition of civilian as well as civilian population while Article 51 outlines the protection of those civilians during war.

Article 42 of Protocol I states that aircrews who are parachuting from aircraft in distress cannot be attacked regardless of what territory they are over. If aircrews land in territory controlled by the enemy, they must be given an opportunity to surrender before being attacked unless it is apparent that they are engaging in a hostile act or attempting to escape. Airborne forces who are descending by parachute from an aircraft, whether it is disabled or not, are not given the protection afforded by this Article and, therefore, may be attacked during their descent unless they are hors de combat.

Article 50 of Protocol 1 defines a civilian as a person who is not a privileged combatant. Article 51 describes the protection that must be given to civilians (unless they are unprivileged combatants) and civilian populations. Article 54 deals with Protection of objects indispensable to the survival of the civilian population, and is categorical that "Starvation of civilians as a method of warfare is prohibited." Chapter III of Protocol I regulates the targeting of civilian objects. Article 8(2)(b)(i) of the Rome Statute of the International Criminal Court also prohibits attacks directed against civilians.

While not all states have ratified Protocol I or the Rome Statute, these provisions reiterated existing customary laws of war which is binding of all belligerents in an international conflict.

Article 3 in the general section of the Geneva Conventions states that in the case of armed conflict not of an international character (occurring in the territory of one of the High Contracting Parties) that each Party to the conflict shall be bound to apply, as a minimum, the following provisions to "persons taking no active part in the hostilities" (non-combatants). Such persons shall in all circumstances be treated humanely, with the following prohibitions:
(a) violence to life and person, in particular murder of all kinds, mutilation, cruel treatment and torture; 
(b) taking of hostages; 
(c) outrages upon personal dignity, in particular humiliating and degrading treatment;
(d) the passing of sentences and the carrying out of executions without previous judgement pronounced by a regularly constituted court, affording all the judicial guarantees which are recognized as indispensable by civilized peoples.

World War II 
In World War II, with the frequency of bombings and air raids on cities, non-combatants were more affected than they were in previous wars. Sources claim that over forty-five million civilians and non-combatants lost their lives over the course of the war. This number, however, is largely debated. Despite the understanding that over 18 million were killed in the Holocaust and as a result of other Nazi persecution, the exact number will likely never be determined. There is also difficulty of estimating the numbers for events such as the Nanjing massacre, though it is estimated that between 200,000 and 300,000 civilians and prisoners of war were slaughtered. This does not necessarily include military, non-combatant or civilian peoples killed by radiation, disease or other means as a result of war. After World War II ended, countries got together with the aim to give rights to non-combatants, and created the 1949 Geneva Conventions, built off the 1907 Hague Convention.

Vietnam War 
The Vietnam War is one war in the mid-20th century in which many civilians were identified to have been killed. Many civilians were not specifically identified as whether they are non-combatants or ordinary civilians, which might have been directly or indirectly killing hundreds and thousands of Vietnamese civilians. However, there is no exact proportion of the number of the non-combatants have or were specify the exact figure, the statistics that has been given were all the estimates on how many civilians and combatants were killed. Most of the recorded number of people missing or killed were not specific, but all were casualties, meaning there is/was no exact figure or combatants or non-combatants. Military records in the National Archives do not specify how many non-combatants were killed during the Vietnam War.

Thousands of people were killed: civilian, casualties, combatants and non-combatants and so as ordinary civilians (citizens) in Vietnam but also in Laos and Cambodia. Thus, all figures do not specify how many non-combatants were killed or injured.

Contemporary warfare and terrorism

War on Terrorism 
Although there is no clear definition of terrorism, a terrorist can be explained as an individual who is a non-state actor who engages in armed hostilities toward a state or government during a time of peace. The location an individual is tried in a court of law is the determining factor between combatant and non-combatant terrorists. Individuals like the San Bernardino shooters, the Tsarnaev brothers and the people responsible for the September 11 attacks would be characterized as non-combatant terrorists. Groups like Al-Qaeda are considered combatant terrorists or may also be called unlawful combatants. Non-combatants can also be looked at as radical civilians and combatants can be seen as military soldiers.

As of 2017, there are inconsistent ways in which the prosecutions of terrorists are conducted. Possible solutions would be to take all individuals classified as non-combatants and have them charged as criminals and prosecute the individuals who are considered combatants and engage in warfare attacks under military commissions. Combatant terrorists are captured and detained in order to put an end to their hostilities and are labeled as prisoners of war, and non-combatants are considered criminals.

See also
Rule of Law in Armed Conflicts Project

References

Further reading
  — A detailed critique of the shortcomings of the common Article 3 of the Geneva Convents.

International humanitarian law